Ziarat-e Tamarkhan (also Romanized as Zīārat-e Tamarkhān; also known as Sharak-e Tamarkhān) is a village in Dasht-e Hor Rural District, in the Central District of Salas-e Babajani County, Kermanshah Province, Iran. At the 2006 census, its population was 865, in 180 families.

References 

Populated places in Salas-e Babajani County